Leeds was launched in Quebec in 1805 and transferred her registry to the United Kingdom that year. She may have been captured in 1809, but if so, she returned to British ownership. She was last listed in 1816.

Career
Leeds first appeared in Lloyd's Register (LR) in 1806.

Lloyds List (LL) reported that on 29 December 1809 a French privateer had captured Leeds, Smith, master, as Leeds was sailing from Rio Janeiro to Malta. The privateer, pierced for 12 guns but mounting five, and 120 men, carried her prize to Algiers.

However, on 2 November 1810 LL reported that Leeds, Smith, master, from Rio de Janeiro, had gone on shore at Liverpool on 30 October. It was feared that the cargo had suffered material damage. It is currently not clear whether earlier report of a capture was incorrect, or whether Leeds had come into British hands by recapture or ransom.

Fate
Leeds was last listed in 1816.

Citations

References
 

1805 ships
Ships built in Quebec
Captured ships
Age of Sail merchant ships of England